

309001–309100 

|-bgcolor=#f2f2f2
| colspan=4 align=center | 
|}

309101–309200 

|-bgcolor=#f2f2f2
| colspan=4 align=center | 
|}

309201–309300 

|-id=206
| 309206 Mažvydas ||  || Martynas Mažvydas (1510–1563), a Lithuanian writer and publisher who edited the first printed book in the Lithuanian language. || 
|-id=227
| 309227 Tsukiko || 2007 QC || Selene "Tsukiko" Mazzucato (born 1994), daughter of Italian co-discoverer Michele Mazzucato || 
|-id=295
| 309295 Hourenzhi ||  || Hou Renzhi (1911–2013), an academician of Chinese Academy of Sciences, is a pioneer of modern historical geography in China. He made outstanding contributions to the development of historical geography both in theory and in practice. || 
|}

309301–309400 

|-bgcolor=#f2f2f2
| colspan=4 align=center | 
|}

309401–309500 

|-bgcolor=#f2f2f2
| colspan=4 align=center | 
|}

309501–309600 

|-bgcolor=#f2f2f2
| colspan=4 align=center | 
|}

309601–309700 

|-bgcolor=#f2f2f2
| colspan=4 align=center | 
|}

309701–309800 

|-id=704
| 309704 Baruffetti ||  || Pietro Baruffetti (born 1954), musician, amateur astronomer, and chairman of the Gruppo Astrofili Massesi (Massesi Amateur Astronomer Group). || 
|-id=706
| 309706 Avila || 2008 GP || Ávila, the capital of the province of Ávila in Spain || 
|}

309801–309900 

|-bgcolor=#f2f2f2
| colspan=4 align=center | 
|}

309901–310000 

|-id=917
| 309917 Sefyani ||  || Fouad Sefyani (born 1967) is a researcher in Cadi Ayyad University's department of physics in Marrakech. In particular he conducts spectral studies of RR Lyrae stars at Oukaïmeden observatory. || 
|}

References 

309001-310000